Venera 14 (called Venus 14 in English) was a probe in the Soviet Venera program for the exploration of Venus.

Venera 14 was identical to the Venera 13 spacecraft, built to take advantage of the 1981 Venus launch opportunity. Venera 14 was launched on 4 November 1981 at 05:31:00 UTC, five days after Venera 13 launched on 30 October 1981 at 06:04:00 UTC.

Design
Each mission consisted of a cruise stage and an attached descent craft.

Cruise stage
As the cruise stage flew by Venus, the bus acted as a data relay for the lander before continuing on to a heliocentric orbit. Venera 14 was equipped with a gamma-ray spectrometer, UV grating monochromator, electron and proton spectrometers, gamma-ray burst detectors, solar wind plasma detectors, and two-frequency transmitters which made measurements before, during, and after the Venus flyby.

Descent lander
The descent lander was a hermetically sealed pressure vessel that contained most of the instrumentation and electronics. The lander was mounted on a ring-shaped landing platform and topped by an antenna. Designed similar to the earlier Venera 9–12 landers, the Venera 14 lander carried instruments to take chemical and isotopic measurements, monitor the spectrum of scattered sunlight, and record electric discharges during its descent phase through the Venusian atmosphere. The spacecraft used a camera system, an X-ray fluorescence spectrometer, a screw drill and surface sampler, a dynamic penetrometer, and a seismometer to conduct investigations on the surface.

The list of lander experiments and instruments include: 
 Accelerometer, Impact analysis – Bison-M
 Thermometers, Barometers – ITD
 Spectrometer / Directional Photometer – IOAV-2
 Ultraviolet Photometer	
 Mass spectrometer – MKh-6411
 Penetrometer / Soil ohmmeter – PrOP-V
 Chemical Redox indicator – Kontrast
 2 color telephotometer cameras – TFZL-077
 Gas chromatograph – Sigma-2
 Radio / Microphone / Seismometer – Groza-2
 Nephelometer – MNV-78-2
 Hydrometer – VM-3R
 X-Ray Fluorescence Spectrometer (Aerosol) – BDRA-1V
 X-Ray Fluorescence Spectrometer (Soil) – Arakhis-2
 Soil Drilling Apparatus – GZU VB-02
 Stabilized Oscillator / Doppler Radio
 Small solar batteries – MSB

Landing

After launch and following a four-month cruise to Venus, the descent vehicle separated from the bus and plunged into the Venusian atmosphere on 5 March 1982. A parachute deployed after the lander entered the atmosphere.

The lander had cameras to take pictures of the ground and spring-loaded arms to measure soil compressibility. The quartz camera windows were covered by lens caps that popped off after descent. By mischance, Venera 14 measured the compressibility of the lens caps instead of the soil after the lens cap came to rest in the exact place where the probe craned down to measure the soil.

The surface soil composition samples were determined by the X-ray fluorescence spectrometer, and were shown to be similar to oceanic tholeiitic basalts.

Like its predecessor, the Venera 14 lander was equipped with acoustic microphones designed to record atmospheric noise. The recordings were later used to calculate the average wind speed on the Venusian surface.

The Venera 14 lander functioned for at least 57 minutes (the lander's planned lifespan was 32 minutes) in an environment with a temperature of 465 °C (869 °F) and a pressure of 94 Earth atmospheres (9.5 MPa). Telemetry was maintained by means of the bus, which carried signals from the lander's uplink antenna.

Post encounter

The spacecraft bus ended up in a heliocentric orbit where it continued to make observations in the X-ray and gamma ray spectrum. The bus activated its engine on the 14th November 1982 to provide data for later Vega program missions. The last published data for the probe is dated 16 March 1983.

Fictional references
 Venera 14 is visited by a Russian cosmonaut in BBC's Space Odyssey: Voyage To The Planets.

Image processing
American researcher Don P. Mitchell has processed the color images from Venera 13 and 14 using the raw original data.  The new images are based on a more accurate linearization of the original 9-bit logarithmic pixel encoding.

See also

 List of missions to Venus

References

External links

Venera program
Derelict landers (spacecraft)
Spacecraft launched in 1981
1981 in the Soviet Union